Vecherniy Kharkov (literally Evening Kharkiv) is a regional Ukrainian newspaper published in Russian. The editor-in-chief of Vecherniy Kharkov is Olena Shevchuk. The newspaper Vecherniy Kharkov is a regional information printed edition for Kharkiv residents and provides information on the life of the region.

History
The newspaper began publication on January 1, 1969, in Ukrainian as Vechirniy Kharkiv. It later switched to a bi-lingual format with Ukrainian and Russian versions being published simultaneously. It is currently published in Russian three times a week and is available by subscription and at newsstands in the Kharkiv area. It also has an online version.

Organization
Together with the football newspaper "GOL!" and TV channel R1 is part of the media group "Region", which is associated with Oleksandr Kahanovskyi, the son-in-law of killed Yevhen Kushnaryov.

References 

Publications established in 1969
Russian-language newspapers published in Ukraine
Bilingual newspapers
Mass media in Kharkiv